"Peanut Butter Jelly" is a song by Swedish electronic music duo Galantis featuring uncredited vocals from Martina Sorbara of Dragonette. It was released on 20 April 2015 as the fourth single from their debut studio album Pharmacy (2015). It became available on 4 April 2015 upon pre-order of the LP. It heavily features a sample of the 1974 single "Kiss My Love Goodbye" by Bettye Swann.

Track listings

Music video 
The music video, directed by Dano Cerny, was posted to YouTube on July 26, 2015, and has since garnered over 131 million views. The video shows two people (presumed to be Galantis) wearing black jackets casually walking into a supermarket as the song begins to play over the PA system. The video features Jillian Sipkins who appears as a girl on roller-skates, whom every one takes notice of. As the song's intro crescendos into the main movement, Sipkins (who is the only character to mimic the lyrics) says "Spread it like", this causes the bored customers and lethargic employees to begin to transform in both their attire and demeanor, shedding their everyday attire for more festive garments while dancing joyously, with some striking a piñata filled with money and others kissing each other. The two men then exit the store, leaving the customers and employees in a raucous party.

Chart performance

Weekly charts

Year-end charts

Certifications

References

2015 singles
2015 songs
Galantis songs
Songs written by Style of Eye
Songs written by Christian Karlsson (DJ)
Songs written by Henrik Jonback
Songs written by Martina Sorbara
Songs written by Svidden
Warner Music Group singles